Mikimoto (written: 幹本, 美樹本 or 御木本) is a Japanese surname. Notable people with the surname include:

, Japanese businessman and creator of the first cultured pearl
, Japanese manga artist, character designer and illustrator
, Japanese actor
, Japanese voice actor

Japanese-language surnames